Bert Foster (19 August 1906 – 31 August 1942) was an Australian rules footballer who played in the Victorian Football League between 1928 and 1936 for the Richmond Football Club. Originally from Echuca, he later coached the Richmond seconds team and the Sandringham Football Club in the Victorian Football Association. He was a fireman for the MFB and died on duty.

References

Hogan P: The Tigers Of Old, Richmond FC, Melbourne 1996

External links

Richmond Football Club players
Richmond Football Club Premiership players
Sandringham Football Club players
Sandringham Football Club coaches
Echuca Football Club players
Australian rules footballers from Victoria (Australia)
Road incident deaths in Victoria (Australia)
1906 births
1942 deaths
Cycling road incident deaths
One-time VFL/AFL Premiership players
People from Echuca
Australian firefighters